Highbury College is a further education college in Portsmouth, Hampshire, England. It offers vocational and academic education and training, including apprenticeships, A-levels and foundation degrees. 

 The college is a member of the Collab Group of further-education institutions, and has achieved Training Quality Standard (TQS) accreditation Part A (whole College) with excellence in Building Services Engineering (Part B). Highbury currently occupies three centres. The three centres are: Highbury Campus, Highbury Northarbour Centre and Highbury Arundel Centre. In addition, marine engineering (boatbuilding) courses and apprenticeships are located in Boathouse 4 in The Portsmouth Historic Dockyards.

The college is also a provider of apprenticeship training in the Southeast and currently offers apprenticeships in more than 40 subject areas.

The college has undergone a major redevelopment of accommodation and facilities in recent years and recently completed a £56.4m building programme across the City of Portsmouth, culminating in the opening of the new Highbury Campus by Princess Anne in October 2009.

In 2019, Penny Wycherley took over Stella Mbubaegbu's responsibilities as principal and CEO at Highbury College.

Areas of Learning 

Access to Higher Education
Art & Design
Automotive Studies,
Beauty & Holistic Therapies
Business, Admin & Financial Services
Computing
Construction & Built Environment
Childcare & Early Years
Engineering
English for Speakers of Other Languages (ESOL)
Fashion
Floristry
GCSE
Hairdressing
Health & Social Care
Catering
Independent Living & Work Skills
Media & Journalism
Occupational Health & Safety
Public Services
Skills for Life
Teacher Training, including Certificate in Education and CELTA
Travel & Tourism

The college also offers a range of university level courses:
Higher National Certificate & Higher National Diploma courses
Certificates in Further and Higher Education
Professional Vocational Qualifications

Highbury NCTJ Diploma in Journalism was recognised as the best-performing newspaper journalism fast-track course in the country for 2007/8. Former Highbury journalism students include political correspondent John Pienaar, presenter Simon Reeves and former ITV news reader Mark Austin.

Origins 
The history of Highbury College can be traced back to the Borough of Portsmouth and Gosport School of Science and Art, a privately funded organisation that was founded in 1870. The main function of the school was to train dockworkers and engineers.

In 1894 the school's science and technology courses were brought under the control of the local authorities as the Borough of Portsmouth Municipal Technical Institute. The Institute had three main departments: Chemistry, Mathematics & Physics, and Civil & Mechanical Engineering. Most students attended evening courses. By 1903 subjects taught included hygiene, biology, physiology, woodcarving, navigation, nautical astronomy and dressmaking.

In 1908 the institute was renamed the Portsmouth Municipal College. Within a few years the college was offering external degree courses recognised by the University of London. The Municipal College was designated a regional College by the Department of Education and Science in the 1950s and renamed the Portsmouth College of Technology.

As a result of the continued expansion of adult and technical education the Local Education Authority (LEA) decided to establish a branch college at Cosham, which provided wider access to Portsmouth and the surrounding areas. This was intended to enable the Portsmouth College of Technology to concentrate on courses at graduate and postgraduate level, which it has done ever since – initially as Portsmouth Polytechnic and more recently as the University of Portsmouth.

Official opening 
Highbury College was officially opened on 17 September 1963 as Highbury Technical College. Built at a cost of £590,700, the college was originally designed for a student population of 2,800, but 5,000 students enrolled in the first year. To solve overcrowding the college leased huts at Rugby Camp, Hilsea, for use as temporary classrooms. These were referred to as the 'Army Camp' by students and staff alike.

The college opened with 78 full-time teaching staff and six departments: Building & Surveying, Commerce & General Studies, Domestic Studies, Engineering, Mathematics & Science and Hotel & Catering. It concentrated on vocational and non-degree level courses so that it would not compete with Portsmouth College of Technology, which later became the University of Portsmouth. In its first year the college offered courses at craft and technician, and higher technician levels, leading to full technological certificates awarded through the City & Guilds. In addition, students could study for O Levels and A Levels, as well as Ordinary National Certificates and Diplomas. Higher National Certificates (HNCs) in Building and Civil Engineering were offered part-time.

The college's language laboratory was the first of its kind on the South Coast of England, which included soundproof cubicles and audio and visual equipment. The language laboratory was introduced with the Common Market in mind and was popular with local businesses wanting to train their staff as a result of increases in exports.

A new block for science teaching was officially opened on 9 February 1966 by Reginald Prentice, then Minister of State for the Department of Education.

History 
A major extension was completed in 1970, which included a 10-storey Tower. 
In 1970 responsibility for the Dockyard Technical College was transferred from the Ministry of Defence to the Local Education Authority, resulting in another 700 students for Highbury. 

Alongside the new accommodation, Highbury acquired new equipment including a radiological laboratory, a digital computer, and a Closed Circuit Television studio (CCTV), which included a broadcast news studio that was able to send programmes to 40 classrooms throughout the college.

By 1971 the college had expanded to ten departments, with 324 full-time teaching staff. Most significantly, Portsmouth Technical College's Hotel & Catering Department was taken over by Highbury when the Technical College assumed polytechnic status.

In 1974 Highbury welcomed its first visitors from Friedrich Albert Lange Vocational College, Duisburg in Germany. 

Student numbers rose steadily over the decade and by 1976 student enrolment reached 10,000.

In the late 1970s the college was approved by the Council for Academic Awards to offer degree courses jointly with Portsmouth Polytechnic, the first of which was a Degree in Hotel and Catering Studies. In recognition of this the college changed its name to Highbury College of Technology in 1978.

In 1982 the former Naval Dockyard Apprentice Training Centre came under civilian management and, as the Unicorn Training Centre, began a transition to a multi-skills training centre for apprentices, school leavers and the unemployed. Highbury took over the new facility in 1983, using it to teach students and apprentices in construction and electrical/electronic trades.

The department's rapid growth necessitated the use of annexes around the city until H Block (pictured above), a new facility for Hotel & Catering courses, was opened in 1981 by Lord Romsey.

Since 2000 
On 1 April 2005 Highbury came under the control of Highbury College Corporation, with members drawn from industry and commerce as well as academic and support staff, the Student Union President and the principal & chief executive.

In 2000 the completion of a £2.2m refurbishment project resulted in new library facilities and the re-cladding of college blocks and the Tower. The library development included study areas and seminar rooms and was officially opened in 2001 by John Monks, then General Secretary of the TUC. In 2002 the college completed a major renovation that included the conversion of the top five floors of the Tower into student accommodation and five floors of refurbished teaching spaces below to include a digital media suite and computer centre.

That same year also saw the official opening of Highbury Apex Centre, which now caters for 14- to 16-year-old school pupils, teaching them vocational skills such as bricklaying, plastering and decorating.

Plans to expand the college's provision in the City Centre were also implemented with the lease of a building adjacent to an existing College site in Arundel Street. Named Highbury City Centre (later to be Highbury Arundel Centre), the facility now includes Eden, a training salon for Hair & Beauty students.

Highbury Northarbour Centre opened in 2004. About 2,000 students signed up for courses in the first year, and today Highbury Northarbour Centre trains students in construction and the built environment, with dedicated workshops for each discipline and a specialist construction library.

Highbury City of Portsmouth Centre (HCPC) opened in October 2007 following several years of planning. Facilities at HCPC include training kitchens and Chimes Fine Dining, an 80-seat training restaurant that is open to the public. The centre was sold to the University of Portsmouth in August 2018.

Running in parallel with the development of HCPC was the redevelopment of Highbury Campus. New teaching and learning environments have replaced old and outdated buildings at the Cosham site, many of which dated back to the opening of the college in 1963.

Marine training programmes 

Highbury College provides a range of vocational and academic programs in and around Portsmouth including Marine Apprenticeship, Boat Construction Maintenance, and Yacht Maintenance. These courses are delivered at the Solent Marine Academy, located in Boathouse4 within the Portsmouth Historic Dockyard.

References

External links

 Highbury College website

Further education colleges in Hampshire
Further education colleges in the Collab Group
Education in Portsmouth
Educational institutions established in 1963
1963 establishments in England